Artemidiconus is a monospecific genus of sea snails, marine gastropod mollusks in the family Conorbidae.

Like other species in the superfamily Conoidea these snails are predatory and venomous, able to inject neurotoxins into their prey with their radula.

This genus was added to the family Conorbidae by Tucker & Tenorio (2009)

Species
The only known species within the genus Artemidiconus is:
 Artemidiconus selenae (van Mol, Tursch & Kempf, 1967)

References

 da Motta, A.J. (1991) A Systematic Classification of the Gastropod Family Conidae at the Generic Level. La Conchiglia, Rome. 48 pp,.

External References
 See image of Artemidiconus selenae (van Mol, Tursch & Kempf, 1967) at Gastropods.com http://www.gastropods.com/3/Shell_9593.shtml

 
Monotypic gastropod genera